Robert Batherson is a Canadian politician and public affairs executive currently serving as president of the Conservative Party of Canada. Before becoming national president, Batherson was a two-term National Councillor from Nova Scotia.

Personal life 
Batherson was born in Sydney, Nova Scotia. He moved to Riverview, New Brunswick and then later to Lower Sackville, Nova Scotia. He was educated at Sackville High School. Batherson earned his bachelor's degree in Public Relations at Mount Saint Vincent University in 1997. He has worked as a marketing executive in various sectors as well as a staffer on Parliament Hill prior to his current role.  Batherson is married and has one son. He is proficient in French and he is the first Conservative Party of Canada President from Atlantic Canada.

Politics 
Batherson began working in communications and research for the Progressive Conservative Association of Nova Scotia Caucus Office and later worked as a political staffer for Peter MacKay. In the 1998 Nova Scotia general election, Batherson ran as a Progressive Conservative party candidate in the riding of Sackville-Cobequid. Following the 1999 Nova Scotia general election he worked as Premier John Hamm's Press Secretary and later as his Communications Director.

Batherson served in the role of President of the Progressive Conservative Association of Nova Scotia between 2009 and 2012.

Batherson then ran again in 2017 Nova Scotia general election in the riding of Halifax Citadel-Sable Island.

In 2016, Batherson was first elected to the Conservative Party of Canada's National Council as a councillor from Nova Scotia. In March 2021, he was elected as the president of the Conservative Party of Canada, taking over from Scott Lamb.

Professional career 
Batherson works as a communications and public affairs advisor. He has served as the chair of the Halifax Chamber of Commerce and the Neptune Theatre Foundation. Batherson has also served as a member of the Halifax Stanfield International Airport's board of directors.

Electoral record

References 

1975 births
Living people
Candidates in Nova Scotia provincial elections
Conservative Party of Canada politicians
People from Sydney, Nova Scotia
Mount Saint Vincent University alumni